Nikolai Alexandrovich Ramazanov (Russian: Николай Александрович Рамазанов (24 January 1817, Saint Petersburg - 18 November 1867, Moscow) was a Russian sculptor, painter, writer and art historian.

Biography 
He came from a theatrical family. His father, was an actor with the Imperial Theatres. A grandfather and uncle were choreographers. His aunt, Maria Valberkhova, was also a dramatic actress, who later turned to comedy.

He began to learn drawing in 1827, at the age of ten, from Fedor Solntsev at the Imperial Academy of Fine Arts. He received his first certificate in 1829 and became a regularly enrolled student in 1833. By this time, both of his parents were dead. 

In 1836, he received a small silver medal for "sculpting from nature" and began to study with Boris Orlovsky. He completed his studies in 1839 as an "Artist 14th Class" and was awarded the right to travel abroad as a pensioner of the Academy. Before departing, he worked on a project at the Winter Palace and participated in creating monuments for Nikolai Karamzin (in Simbirsk), and Gavril Derzhavin (in Kazan). He left for Italy in 1843.

In 1846, he was recalled to Russia as the result of a clash with the Papal Police. By the end of the year, he was offered a job as a teacher at the Moscow School of Painting, Sculpture and Architecture. He took up that position the following year, but soon had to attend to the sudden collapse of a statue he had made for the new .

He returned to the school at the first opportunity and remained there for the rest of his life. In 1849, he was named an Academician and, in 1858, was elevated to Professor. Matvei Chizhov is, perhaps, his best-known student. For many years, he was employed by the literary journal, Moskvityanin and the Moskovskiye Vedomosti; writing biographies and obituaries of artists as well as notes on art exhibitions.  

In 1866, he was forced to resign, for unknown reasons. He died the following year; leaving behind a widow, a son, and two daughters.

Among his most familiar works are the bas-reliefs on the pedestal of the Monument to Nicholas I, in Saint Petersburg, some external decorations at the Cathedral of Christ the Saviour, and several busts; including ones of Fyodor Petrovich Tolstoy, Alexander Pushkin and Nikolai Gogol, which was created from his death mask.

Sources 
 Alexei Petrovich Novitsky; Biography from the Русский биографический словарь @ Russian WikiSource

External links

 "About the Art Restorer, Nikolai Ivanovich Podklyuchnikov", by Ramazanov. in: the Moskvityanin, 1853, #22

1817 births
1867 deaths
Russian sculptors
Imperial Academy of Arts alumni
Russian art historians
Artists from Saint Petersburg
Academic staff of the Moscow School of Painting, Sculpture and Architecture